Dele Joseph Ezeoba   (born 25 July 1958) is a retired  vice admiral in the Nigerian Navy who was the 20th Chief of Naval Staff. Prior to that appointment he served as the Deputy Commandant Officer the Armed Forces Command and Staff College (AFCSC), Jaji, Nigeria.

Early life
Admiral Ezeoba was born on 25 July 1958 in Jos, Plateau State, Nigeria.
He attended the Nigerian Defence Academy, Kaduna, before he proceeded to the Britannia Royal Naval College.
He later attended the AFCSC as well as the Naval War College, Newport, Rhode Island. He also obtained a Master of science (M. sc) in Strategic Studies from the University of Ibadan.

Naval  career
Prior to his appointment as the Nigerian Navy Chief of Naval Staff on 4 October 2012, he was the Deputy Commandant Officer of the AFCSC.
He has also held several positions in the Nigerian Navy until he attained the peak of his naval career as the Chief of Naval Staff.
He served as the  Director of Operations Naval Headquarters (NHQ), Commanding Officer of the Nigerian Navy's premier training institution, Command Operations Officer Eastern Naval Command and member of the Armed Forces Transformation Committee.

National assignments
He took part in the following national assignments:
Member of the Governing Board of Nigerian Maritime Administration and Safety Agency (NIMASA)
Chairman of the Nigerian Maritime Administration and Safety Agency (NIMASA) Committee on Combating Piracy and Environmental Pollution in Nigeria Waters
Chairman of the Presidential Inter-Agency Maritime Security Task Force (IAMSTF) on acts of illegalities in Nigerian waters.
Chairman of the Ministerial Committee on Problems of Cargo Allocation by National Maritime Authority (NMA).

See also
Nigerian Navy

References

Nigerian Navy officers
Nigerian military personnel
1958 births
Living people
Nigerian Navy admirals
University of Ibadan alumni
People from Plateau State
People from Jos
Chiefs of Naval Staff (Nigeria)